Sarab-e Karian (also Romanized as Sarāb-e Karīān; also known as Karayān, Kareyān, and Karīān) is a village in Jalalvand Rural District, Firuzabad District, Kermanshah County, Kermanshah Province, Iran. At the 2006 census, its population was 149, in 35 families.

References 

Populated places in Kermanshah County